This is a list of notable Nigerian film producers.
 

 Abdalla Uba Adamu
 Adegboyega Dosunmu Amororo II
 Adekunle Adejuyigbe
 Ado Ahmad Gidan Dabino
 Afro Candy
 Aisha Augie-Kuta
 Akanimo Odon
 Akin Ogungbe
 Remi Abiola
 Toyin Abraham
 Genevieve Nnaji
 Judith Audu 
 Odunlade Adekola
 Yewande Adekoya
 Dolapo 'LowlaDee' Adeleke
 Wale Adenuga
 Funsho Adeolu
 Kareem Adepoju
 Ayo Adesanya
 Sikiru Adesina
 Eric Aghimien
 Niji Akanni
 Biola Alabi
 Bose Alao
 Eddy Young
 Mahmood Ali-Balogun
 Fred Amata
 Jeta Amata
 Bolaji Amusan
 Chika Anadu
 Chet Anekwe
 Chineze Anyaene
 Pascal Atuma
 Gloria Bamiloye
 Michelle Bello
 Sadiq Daba
 Regina Daniels
 Caroline Danjuma
 Emamode Edosio
 Albert Egbe
 Zeb Ejiro
 Tam Fiofori
 Mercy Aigbe Gentry
 Shan George
 Paul Igwe
 Chris Ihidero
 Rotimi Adelola
 Lancelot Oduwa Imasuen
 Moses Inwang
 Emem Isong
 Ruth Kadiri
 Tunde Kelani
 Bisi Komolafe
 Obafemi Lasode
 Akin Lewis
 Lola Margaret
 Oliver Mbamara
 Toka McBaror
 Echezonachukwu Nduka
 Nkiru Njoku
 David Nnaji
 Charles Novia
 Benneth Nwankwo
 Onyeka Nwelue
 Chike Nwoffiah
 Lonzo Nzekwe
 Uche Odoh
 Dele Odule
 Mayowa Oluyeba
 Saint Obi
 Femi Odugbemi
 Tade Ogidan
 Kingsley Ogoro
 Iyabo Ojo
 Ronke Ojo
 Okechukwu Oku
 Ivie Okujaye
 Juliana Olayode
 Cossy Orjiakor
 Bimbo Oshin
 Wale Ojo
 Izu Ojukwu
 Tope Oshin
 Clarence Peters
 Robert O. Peters
 Zina Saro-Wiwa
 Ayo Shonaiya
 Sola Sobowale
 Bob-Manuel Udokwu
 Eddie Ugbomah
 Sam Ukala
 Jeff Unaegbu
 Mary Uranta
 Uzee Usman
 Uzo
 Remi Vaughan-Richards
 Rogers Ofime
 Temitope Duker
 Kunle Afolayan
 Moji Afolayan

References

Nigerian film producers
Film producers
Nigerian
21st-century Nigerian businesspeople